Dänholm (literally Danes' Isle) is a small island on the German coast of the Baltic Sea. It is situated in the Strelasund just east of Stralsund.  Both bridges linking Rügen with the mainland, Rügendamm and Rügenbrücke, run across it.  The island was the scene of an incident between the Swedish and French armies in 1807, when it belonged to Swedish Pomerania.

Sources
This article is fully or partially based on material from Nordisk familjebok, 1904–1926.

External links
 Dänholm episode in the Napoleonic wars

German islands in the Baltic
Islands of Mecklenburg-Western Pomerania